Bonab (electoral district) is the 7th electoral district in the East Azerbaijan Province of Iran.  This electoral district has a population of 129,795 and elects 1 member of parliament.  From the 1st to 5th Iranian legislative elections Bonab and Malekan were a joint electoral district, and in just the first election had 2 members of Islamic Consultative Assembly.

1980
MPs in 1980 from the electorate of Bonab and Malekan. (1st)
 Yousef Jaberi
 Ali-Akbar Asghari

1984
MP in 1984 from the electorate of Bonab and Malekan. (2nd)
 Heidar Jafari

1988
MP in 1988 from the electorate of Bonab and Malekan. (3rd)
 Rasoul Sediqi Bonabi

1992
MP in 1992 from the electorate of Bonab and Malekan. (4th)
 Rasoul Sediqi Bonabi

1996
MP in 1996 from the electorate of Bonab and Malekan. (5th)
 Salman Khodadadi

2000
MP in 2000 from the electorate of Bonab. (6th)
 Rasoul Sediqi Bonabi

2004
MP in 2004 from the electorate of Bonab. (7th)
 Rasoul Sediqi Bonabi

2008
MP in 2008 from the electorate of Bonab. (8th)
 Zia-Allah Ezazi Maleki

2012
MP in 2012 from the electorate of Bonab. (9th)
 Mohammad Bagheri

2016

Notes

References

Electoral districts of East Azerbaijan
Bonab County
Deputies of Bonab